is a railway station in the city of Aisai, Aichi Prefecture, Japan, operated by Meitetsu.

Lines

Station layout
The station has two opposed side platforms connected by an underground passage. The station has automated ticket machines, Manaca automated turnstiles and is unattended.

Platforms

Adjacent stations

|-
!colspan=5|Nagoya Railroad

Station history
Fuchidaka Station was opened on October 1, 1924 as a station on the privately held Bisai Railroad, which was purchased by Meitetsu on August 1, 1925 becoming the Meitetsu Bisai Line. The station has been unattended since 1958.

Passenger statistics
In fiscal 2017, the station was used by an average of 1,688 passengers daily (boarding passengers only).

Surrounding area
Saori Technical School
Saori Special Education School

See also
 List of Railway Stations in Japan

References

External links

 Official web page 

Railway stations in Japan opened in 1924
Railway stations in Aichi Prefecture
Stations of Nagoya Railroad
Aisai, Aichi